Allrode is a village and a former municipality in the district of Harz, in Saxony-Anhalt, Germany. Since 1 January 2011, it is part of the town Thale.

There are two prominent trees - the Hohle Eiche ("hollow oak") and Adlereiche ("eagle oak") - in the woods northeast of the village that were checkpoints 57 and 58 in the Harzer Wandernadel hiking network. Today checkpoint 57 is the Echowiese Allrode.

References

Former municipalities in Saxony-Anhalt
Thale
Villages in the Harz